The Arun Valley line, also known as the Mid Sussex line, is part of the Southern- and Thameslink-operated railway services. For the initial part of the route trains follow the Brighton Main Line, and at a junction south of Three Bridges the route turns westwards. It then runs via Crawley, Horsham (where there is a junction with the Portsmouth Line) and Arundel, before meeting the West Coastway line at Arundel Junction. Trains on the Arun Valley line then proceed to either Bognor Regis, Portsmouth Harbour or Southampon Central

Many stations on this line retain the short platforms which were originally built, not being extended by the Southern Railway when the line was modernised in the 1930s. This causes operational difficulties to this day, which require frequent platform and on-train announcements, telling passengers they must travel in the correct part of the train.

History 
The line was opened in three stages by the London, Brighton and South Coast Railway (LB&SCR) between 1848 and 1863, creating what was then known as Mid-Sussex route to Portsmouth.

Three Bridges–Horsham
A single track branch line was opened on 14 February 1848, with passing places at the intermediate stations at Crawley and Faygate. The line was doubled throughout in 1862. The stations now at Ifield and Littlehaven were not opened with the line, both being opened on 1 June 1907: Ifield as Lyons Crossing Halt and Littlehaven as Rusper Road Halt; both serving the outskirts of their nearby towns. An additional stop was opened at Roffey Road Halt', however this station was closed in the 1937, as the land next to the station had remained undeveloped.

Horsham–Pulborough

The Midhurst Railways line from Horsham to Pulborough, Petworth and Midhurst was opened on 10 October 1859. The section from Hardham Junction to Midhurst was closed between 1964 and 1966. The Steyning Line from Horsham to Shoreham by Sea was opened on 1 July 1861 branching off at Itchingfield Junction south of Horsham. It closed in 1966.

Pulborough–Arundel
The line between Hardham Junction south of Pulborough, and Arundel Junction on the coast line via Arundel was finally opened on 3 August 1863 creating a through route to Portsmouth.

Originally, the main LB&SCR route from London to Portsmouth used the Portsmouth line to reach Horsham. However, with the increase in demand at Gatwick Airport, the mainline services were re-routed in 1978 to serve the airport and then travel via Three Bridges.

Electrification
The line was electrified using the (750 V DC third rail) system by the Southern Railway in 1938 as part of the proposals to electrify the lines from London to Portsmouth. This originally only covered the section from Horsham to Littlehampton and Barnham, as the main line was the line through Dorking and Sutton, as opposed to the line to Three Bridges, but plans were extended to electrify the "branch" as well in the same year.

Electric services were provided by electric multiple units. For most of the rest of the twentieth century, an hourly express service was provided which joined/divided at Barnham, with 4 or 8 coaches continuing to Bognor and 4 to Portsmouth Harbour. This called at Arundel, Pulborough and latterly Billingshurst, going via Sutton and Dorking. An all-stations stopping service also ran hourly via Crawley to Bognor Regis, usually via Littlehampton.

Later work
Two bridges on the line, The Black Rabbit Bridge (just north of Arundel) and the Peppering Bridge (a few hundred yards further on) were replaced during the August Bank Holiday weekend of 2009. The line was completely closed to traffic during these major engineering works and a replacement bus service served stations between Arundel and Pulborough. As the two-week Arundel Festival was drawing to a close over the weekend, Southern maintained a service into the station from the West Coastway Line from Bognor Regis via Barnham and Ford, and a reversal at Littlehampton.

Services 
There are currently four trains per hour in each direction over the route off-peak, made up of twin portions from two trains per hour from London Victoria. This is the most frequent service on the route since the late 1970s.

Down-line services:
Both divide at Horsham, the train on the hour has a front portion which is fast to Barnham then onto Portsmouth Harbour. The rear portion is semi-fast to Bognor Regis (not calling at Christ's Hospital and Amberley Stations).
The 30-minutes-past train's front portion again runs fast to Barnham then is semi-fast to Southampton Central. The rear section calls all stations to Bognor Regis.

Up-line service:
Again two trains an hour, both services attach at Horsham. The Bognor Regis section always arrives first unless there is disruption and then a section from either Portsmouth Harbour or Southampton Central arrives. Once the train has attached it runs semi fast to London Victoria via the Horsham Branch Line (Horsham to Three Bridges) and the fast Quarry Line.
Each of the up services arrive with normally a 10-minute interchange for the stopping services to London Bridge and the one closest the hour for the Mole Valley service towards Dorking.

Typical off-peak journey times from London Victoria (via Redhill and Gatwick Airport)
Based on December 2006 timetable, prior to the introduction of the train split at Horsham and the non-stop services Horsham to Barnham. In 2016 most of the off-peak fast services reached Barnham in 80–81 minutes and Chichester in 88; peak-hour services were slightly slower.
Stations in italics are served by through trains but are not part of the Arun Valley line.

Typical off-peak journey times from London Bridge (via Redhill and Gatwick Airport)

Based on December 2006 timetable. Stations in italics are served by through trains but are not part of the Arun Valley line. There are two trains per hour on this route. Some stations between London Bridge and Gatwick Airport have been omitted. Faygate is served during peak hours only.

References

Bibliography

External links 

Map showing Arun Valley Line route
 Interactive map of Arun Valley Line stations, bus links and things to do
 A website outlining the main stations along the line with links to local websites at each stop

Rail transport in West Sussex
Railway lines in South East England
Railway lines opened in 1863
Standard gauge railways in England
1863 establishments in England